Boreyko may refer to:

People
 Andrey Boreyko, Russian conductor
 Stanislav Boreyko , Soviet sprint canoeist
 Valentin Boreyko (1933-2012), Russian rower

Other
 Boreyko coat of arms, Polish coat of arms